Mahabharat Aur Barbareek is a 2013 Indian Hindi language real film starring Amit Rao Jeetendra as Barbareek, Bheem's grandson through Ghatotkacha. It is the last movie that Dharmesh Tiwari acted in. The movie was directed by Dharmesh Tiwari. It is based on the story of Barbareek, who had enough power to turn the tide of the battle any way he wanted. Several of the original actors who acted in BR Chopra's Mahabharat, made in 1988, acted in this movie too.

Plot
The story starts with the Pandavas in exile with Bheema and Hidimbi's Grandson Barbareeka often called as Lord Shyam or Shyam Baba. The story based around Mahabharat, revolves around Barbareeka (later named Shyam Baba by Lord Krishna), who had a powerful astra, known as the 'Teen Baan' (three infallible arrows). This astra would've potentially overpowered any side that Barbareeka would choose to confront. The story revolves around the sacrifice Barbareeka eventually has to make for the greater good.

Cast
 Nitish Bharadwaj as Krishna
 Gajendra Chauhan as Yudhisthra
 Praveen Kumar as Bhima
 Arjun as Arjuna
 Sanjeev Chitre as Nakula
 Roopa Ganguly as Draupadi
 Puneet Issar as Duryodhana
 Vinod Kapoor as Dushasana
 Pankaj Dheer as Karna
 Shahbaz Khan as Ghatotkacha
 Hema Malini as Hidimbi
 Gufi Paintal as Shakuni
 Surendra Pal as Drona
 Rishabh Shukla as Shiva
 Vindu Dara Singh as Hanuman
 Gracy Singh as Mauravi
 Dharmesh Tiwari as Narada
 Amit Rao Jeetendra as Barabareek
 Jeetendra in a cameo role

References

External links

2013 films
2010s Hindi-language films
Films based on the Mahabharata